Montagnat is a commune in the Ain department in eastern France.

Geography
Montagnat is a village located near the city of Bourg-en-Bresse.

Population

See also
Communes of the Ain department

References

Communes of Ain
Ain communes articles needing translation from French Wikipedia